Michael A. Kahn is an American businessman based in Charlotte, North Carolina. He is the founder and CEO of Kahn Ventures, Inc., which operates the 15th largest beer and wine distribution in the United States.

In June 2006, Kahn bought the Charlotte Checkers, a minor professional ice hockey team that played in the ECHL. In 2010 he brought the American Hockey League to Charlotte when he purchased and relocated the Albany River Rats, since renamed the Charlotte Checkers.

References

External links
Michael A. Kahn's staff ptofile at Eliteprospects.com

Living people
American Hockey League
Year of birth missing (living people)